I Make a Wish for a Potato is a compilation album by psychedelic folk band The Holy Modal Rounders, released on April 10, 2001 through Rounder Records. The album draws from the band's three releases on Rounder Records and also includes songs by associated acts such as Michael Hurley as well as the Clamtones.

Track listing

References 

2001 compilation albums
The Holy Modal Rounders albums
Rounder Records compilation albums